Oak Forest is a historic home located near Mechanicsville, Hanover County, Virginia. It was built about 1828, and is a  two-story, five-bay, frame I-house dwelling in the Federal style.  The house sits on a brick foundation, has a standing seam metal gable roof, and exterior end chimneys. Also on the property is a contributing smokehouse.

It was listed on the National Register of Historic Places in 1999.

References

Houses on the National Register of Historic Places in Virginia
Federal architecture in Virginia
Houses completed in 1828
Houses in Hanover County, Virginia
National Register of Historic Places in Hanover County, Virginia